The 16th Annual GLAAD Media Awards (2005) were presented at three separate ceremonies: March 28 in New York; April 30 in Los Angeles; and June 11 in San Francisco. The awards were presented to honor "fair, accurate and inclusive" representations of gay individuals in the media.

Billy Crystal was honored with the Excellence in Media Award; given to "individuals in the media and entertainment industries who through their work have increased the visibility and understanding of the LGBT community." Alan Cumming was given the Vito Russo Award; given to "an openly lesbian, gay or bisexual member of the entertainment or media community for outstanding contributions toward eliminating homophobia."

The following is a list of the awards given:

Special Recognition
 Vanguard Award - Liza Minnelli
 Davidson/Valentini Award - Alec Mapa
 Vito Russo Award - Alan Cumming
 Excellence in Media Award - Billy Crystal
 Golden Gate Award - Jennifer Beals
 Stephen F. Kolzak Award - Bill Condon
 Barbara Gittings Award - PlanetOut, Inc.
 Pioneer Award - Hank Plante
 Special Recognition: The Daily Show with Jon Stewart

Awards
(winners in bold)

Film Awards
 Outstanding Film - Wide Release
 Alexander (Warner Bros.)
 A Home at the End of the World (Warner Independent Pictures)
 Kinsey (Fox Searchlight Pictures)
 Monster (Newmarket Films)
 Saved! (United Artists)
 Outstanding Film - Limited Release
 Bad Education (Sony Pictures Classics)
 Bear Cub (TLA Releasing)
 Blue Gate Crossing (Strand Releasing)
 Brother to Brother (Wolfe Releasing)
 The Mudge Boy (Strand Releasing/Showtime)

Television Awards
 Outstanding Drama Series
 Kevin Hill (UPN)
 The L Word (Showtime)
 Queer as Folk (Showtime)
 Six Feet Under (HBO)
 The Wire (HBO)
 Outstanding Comedy Series
 Will & Grace
 Outstanding Individual Episode (in a series without a regular gay character)
 "Daniela", Cold Case (CBS)
 "It's Raining Men", Cold Case (CBS)
 "Lost Boys", Jack & Bobby (The WB)
 "Old Flame with a New Wick", Two and a Half Men (CBS)
 "The Real World Rittenhouse", Strong Medicine (Lifetime)
 Outstanding Television Movie or Mini-Series
 The Blackwater Lightship (CBS)
 Jack (Showtime)
 Outstanding Reality Program
 American Candidate (Showtime)
 Big Brother 5 (CBS)
 Queer Eye for the Straight Guy (Bravo)
 The Real World: Philadelphia (MTV)
 Survivor: Vanuatu (CBS)
 Outstanding Documentary
 No Secret Anymore: The Times of Del Martin and Phyllis Lyon (Sundance Channel)
 The Opposite Sex: Rene's Story (Showtime)
 Paternal Instinct (Cinemax)
 Tarnation (Wellspring Media)
 True Life: I'm Gay and I'm Getting Married (MTV)
 Outstanding Daily Drama
 All My Children (ABC)
 One Life to Live (ABC)
 Outstanding Talk Show Episode
 "The 11-Year-Old Who Wants a Sex Change", The Oprah Winfrey Show
 "Alan Cumming", The Graham Norton Effect (Comedy Central)
 "I was Born a Woman...Today I'm a Man", Maury
 Outstanding TV Journalism
 AIDS: A Pop Culture History (VH1)
 "Scenes from a Marriage", Dateline NBC (NBC)
 "They Didn't Ask, He Didn't Tell", 60 Minutes (CBS)
 "Trapped", 48 Hours Investigates (CBS)
 "Without Mercy", Dateline NBC (NBC)

Print
 Outstanding Magazine Article
 "At Home in Two Worlds", by Dirk Johnson and Adam Piore (Newsweek)
 "Coming Out in Corporate America", by Cliff Edwards (BusinessWeek)
 "Growing Up With Mom & Mom", by Susan Dominus (The New York Times Magazine)
 "Homophobia of All Hues", by Christopher Lisotta (The Nation)
 "Should Their Love be Legal?", by Jessica Dulong (CosmoGIRL!)
 Outstanding Magazine Overall Coverage
 The Chronicle of Higher Education
 The Nation
 Newsweek
 People
 Time
 Outstanding Newspaper Article
 "Fatherly Love", by Richard A. Marini (San Antonio Express-News)
 "A Grim Prognosis", by Laura Bond (Westword)
 "In the Bible Belt, Acceptance is Hard-Won", by Anne Hull (The Washington Post)
 "LAPD Still Biased, Gays Allege", by Nora Zamichow (Los Angeles Times)
 "Two Brothers, Two Weddings, One Family", by Thomas Farragher and Patricia Wen (Boston Globe)
 Outstanding Newspaper Columnist
 Ellen Goodman (Boston Globe)
 Derrick Z. Jackson (Boston Globe)
 Patrick Moore (Los Angeles Times, Newsday)
 Deb Price (The Detroit News)
 Frank Rich (The New York Times)
 Outstanding Newspaper Overall Coverage
 Boston Globe
 The New York Times
 San Francisco Chronicle
 The Seattle Times
 South Florida Sun-Sentinel
 Outstanding Advertising - Print
 "Are You Putting Us On?" - Kenneth Cole
 "Jill" - Grand Marnier
 "Menotte Bracelets" - Cartier
 "This is Love. It's Not Up for a Vote." - Shreve, Crump & Low
 Outstanding Comic Book
 Ex Machina (Wildstorm/DC Comics)
 Hard Time (DC Comics)
 Luba (Fantagraphics Books)
 My Faith in Frankie (Vertigo/DC Comics)
 Strangers in Paradise (Abstract Studio)

Digital
 Outstanding Digital Journalism Article
 "The Cutting Edge", by Claudia Kolker (Slate.com)
 "No Straight Answers", by Randy B. Hecht (AARP.com)
 "Rainbow and Red", by Emily Alpert (IntheFray.com)
 "Sex, Lies and the 'Down Low'", by Whitney Joiner (Salon.com)
 "Sylvester: Living Proof", by James Earl Hardy (Africana.com)
 Outstanding Advertising - Electronic
 "Bouncer" - United Church of Christ
 "Coco" - Orbitz
 "Penn Pals" - Greater Philadelphia Tourism Marketing Corporation
 "Watch and Learn: Gay Marriage" - MTV

Music & Theater
 Outstanding Music Artist
 Melissa Etheridge, Lucky
 George Michael, Patience
 Scissor Sisters, Scissor Sisters
 Le Tigre, This Island
 Rufus Wainwright, Want Two
 Outstanding Los Angeles Theater
 Last Summer at Bluefish Cove
 Like a Dog on Linoleum
 The Paris Letter
 Stage Directions
 Take Me Out
 Outstanding New York Theater: Broadway and Off-Broadway
 Bare: A Pop Opera
 La Cage Aux Folles
 The Normal Heart
 The Tricky Part
 Where Do We Live?
 Outstanding New York Theater: Off-Off-Broadway
 Bald Diva!
 The Big Voice: God or Merman?
 Dog Sees God: Confessions of a Teenage Blockhead
 Love According to Luc
 Us

External links
16th Annual GLAAD Media Awards
GLAAD Website

References

16th
2005 awards
2005 in LGBT history
Lists of LGBT-related award winners and nominees